Ward Family House is a historic home located near Sugar Grove, Watauga County, North Carolina.  It was built about 1897, and is a two-story, Queen Anne style frame dwelling. It is sheathed in novelty German siding and gables with five rows of diamond-edge wood shingles. Atop the roof is a cupola located between asymmetrically placed brick chimneys with stucco panels. A one-story rear ell was added in the 1980s.

It was listed on the National Register of Historic Places in 1997.

References

Houses on the National Register of Historic Places in North Carolina
Queen Anne architecture in North Carolina
Houses completed in 1897
Houses in Watauga County, North Carolina
National Register of Historic Places in Watauga County, North Carolina